Franz Meier (born 16 September 1956) is a Swiss hurdler. He competed in the 400 metres hurdles at the 1980 Summer Olympics and the 1984 Summer Olympics.

References

1956 births
Living people
Athletes (track and field) at the 1980 Summer Olympics
Athletes (track and field) at the 1984 Summer Olympics
Swiss male hurdlers
Olympic athletes of Switzerland
World Athletics Championships athletes for Switzerland
Place of birth missing (living people)